Thaumastocera akwa is a species of Horse fly in the family Tabanidae.

Distribution
Guinea & Sierra Leone to Uganda & Congo.

References

Tabanidae
Insects described in 1906
Diptera of Africa
Taxa named by Karl Grünberg